The Kagera River, also known as Akagera River, or Alexandra Nile, is an East African river, forming part of the upper headwaters of the Nile and carrying water from its most distant source.

The section of river named Kagera begins in Burundi, flowing out from Lake Rweru. From the lake, it flows east along the Rwanda-Burundi and Rwanda-Tanzania borders to a confluence with the Ruvubu River. The waters of the Kagera are thus provided by two major tributaries, the Nyabarongo of Rwanda, which feeds Lake Rweru, and the Ruvubu of Burundi. It is unknown which of these two feeder rivers is the longer and hence the ultimate source of the Nile. From the confluence, the Kagera flows north along the Rwanda-Tanzania border, over Rusumo Falls and through Akagera National Park. It then takes a turn to the east, following the Tanzania-Uganda border and emptying into Lake Victoria in Uganda. In 1898, Richard Kandt discovered the source of the Kagera.

The river has featured prominently in the histories of the countries it runs through, particularly Rwanda.  In 1894, German Gustav Adolf von Götzen crossed the Kagera at Rusumo Falls, marking the Rwandan colonial era that officially started in 1899. And in 1916, during World War I, the Belgians defeated the Germans, entering Rwanda by the same route.  The river gained international notoriety in 1994 for carrying bodies from the Rwandan genocide into Lake Victoria, causing a state of emergency to be declared in areas of Uganda, where these bodies eventually washed up.

Geography

The Kagera rises in Burundi and flows into Lake Victoria. It is the largest single inflow into the lake, contributing approximately 6.4 billion cubic metres of water a year (about 28 per cent of the lake's outflow). The Kagera is formed by the confluence of the Ruvuvu and the Nyabarongo, close to the northernmost point of Lake Tanganyika. It forms parts of the Burundi–Tanzania, Rwanda–Tanzania, Burundi–Rwanda, and Tanzania–Uganda borders. It lends its name to Akagera National Park in northern Rwanda, as well as to the Kagera Region of Tanzania. On the river are the Rusumo Falls, an important crossing point between Rwanda and Tanzania. It is near the town of Rusumo.

Fish
The Kagera River basin is rich in fish. , there were at least 55 species known from the Rwandan section alone and the actual number is likely higher. Additionally, there are at least 15 undescribed species of haplochromine cichlids that are endemic to some of the lakes in the upper parts of the river basin. Because of the many waterfalls and rapids, the various sections of the Kagera River basin are clearly separated, making movements by fish between them difficult or even impossible.

Genocide
During the Rwandan genocide of 1994, the Kagera was used to dispose of corpses as thousands of Tutsis and Hutu political moderates were murdered on the river banks. The river brought the massacred bodies into Lake Victoria, creating a serious health hazard in Uganda.

See also 
 Ruvuvu River - Right tributary of the river 
 Nyabarongo River - Left tributary of the river

References

Notes

Sources

External links

 
International rivers of Africa
Nile basin
Rivers of Burundi
Rivers of Rwanda
Rivers of Tanzania
Rivers of Uganda
Border rivers
Rwanda–Tanzania border
Tanzania–Uganda border
Burundi–Tanzania border
Burundi–Rwanda border
Tributaries of Lake Victoria